A Coney Island is a type of restaurant that is popular in the northern United States, particularly in Michigan  as well as the name for the Coney Island hot dog after which the restaurant style is named.

Origins 

"Coney Islands", as they are known, are a unique type of American restaurant. The first Coney Island restaurant was opened in Jackson, Michigan, in 1914 by a Macedonian immigrant named George Todoroff.  Today two unaffiliated Coney Island restaurants, Jackson Coney Island and Virginia Coney Island, are located in a building near the train station on East Michigan Avenue near the site of his original restaurant.  In addition, several local restaurants throughout the Jackson area offer their own version of the Coney Island hot dog, or just "coney" as referred to by local residents.

Two of the best-known Coney Island restaurants are the Lafayette Coney Island and the American Coney Island, which are located in adjacent buildings on Lafayette Boulevard in downtown Detroit. They have a common root, with the original restaurant having been established by Greek immigrant brothers Bill and Gus Keros in 1915. The brothers got into a business dispute soon thereafter, and in 1917 split their restaurant into the two establishments that exist today.

Many European immigrants of the early twentieth century entered the United States through Ellis Island. One of their first stops was often the Coney Island neighborhood of Brooklyn, along the South Shore beachfront, where hot dogs were very popular. The original restaurant name referred to the restaurant being an immigrant-owned establishment, serving Coney Island's food of choice.

Typical menu  

The menu of all Coney Island restaurants centers on the Coney Island hot dog, which is a natural-casing hot dog in a steamed bun dressed with chili, diced onions, and yellow mustard. This item is usually referred to simply as a "coney."  Another popular item on most Coney Island restaurant menus is the "loose hamburger," which consists of crumbled ground beef in a hot dog bun, covered in the same condiments as a Coney Island hot dog.  Many Coney Islands also serve "chili fries," which are french fries covered in chili, sometimes with mustard, onions and/or cheese added.

Many Coney Islands offer other Greek and Greek-American dishes, such as gyros, souvlaki, shish kebab, spanakopita, saganaki, and Greek salads, as well as usual American diner fare, such as regular hamburgers, sandwiches, breakfast items, and desserts.

Growth of the Coney Island restaurant 

Since the owners of the first Coney Island restaurants did not trademark the name or business plan, many other restaurants began using the same name and formula. Coney Islands were opened throughout the city by Greek immigrants.
Coney Islands have developed a distinctive dining style that is repeated in hundreds of different restaurants throughout the metropolitan Detroit area and elsewhere in Michigan and other nearby states. There are some regional variations though, such as the chili sauce, which is more liquid in Detroit area Coney Island restaurants compared to the drier sauce served in Coney Island restaurants in the nearby Jackson, Michigan and Flint, Michigan areas.

Many Greek diners in Buffalo, New York, and throughout upstate New York, northeastern Pennsylvania (particularly Wilkes-Barre) and New Jersey are similar in format to Detroit-style Coney Islands, even serving their own style of  dogs, called a Texas Hot or Texas Wiener.  Unlike the Coney Island restaurants in Detroit, though, the Texas Hot is often not the dominant menu item in these establishments.

Sioux City, Iowa, also has a handful of Coney Island eateries, as do the Houston, Texas; Oklahoma City, Oklahoma; Scottsdale, Arizona; Tulsa, Oklahoma, and Fort Wayne, Indiana areas.

Coney Island restaurant chains

James Coney Island

James Coney Island, Inc. is a chain of fast food restaurants that specializes in Coney Island hot dogs. It has its headquarters, the James Coney Island Support Center, located in Suite 700 in the 11111 Katy Freeway building in Houston.

Leo's Coney Island 
The Leo's Coney Island chain was created by Greek brothers Peter and Leo Stassinopoulos. The brothers are nephews to Bill and Gust Keros who founded American and Lafayette Coney Islands. Peter and Leo worked at local Coney Island restaurants until they opened their own Coney Island in 1972 called the Southfield Souvlaki Coney Island in Southfield, Michigan. One location opened in 1978 in Michigan and another in 1982 in Farmington Hills. In 1988, the name Leo's Coney Island was given to its newest location in Troy, Michigan. From then on, the chain took on the name Leo's Coney Island. The brothers began franchising in 2005 and are now the largest Coney Island chain in the world. 

Leo's uses buns from the Metropolitan Baking Company and the coney sauce is their own recipe manufactured by The Milton Chili Company located in Madison Heights. The natural casing hot dogs are supplied by the Koegel Meat Company.

National Coney Island 

National Coney Island is a Coney Island-style restaurant based in Michigan that specializes in Greek-American cuisine. It is a corporation that has more than 20 National Coney Island locations in the Metro Detroit area.

In popular culture
Detroit's American Coney Island and Lafayette Coney Island have both been featured on episodes of Travel Channel shows Man v. Food and Food Wars.

See also
 Coney Island hot dog
 List of Greek restaurants
 Tony Packo's

References

Further reading
 
 Christoff, Chris (April 1, 2014). "Detroit’s Coney Island Hot Dogs Are Edible Solace for City". Bloomberg.

 .
 .
 
 
 Yung, Katherine and Joe Grimm (2012). Coney Detroit. Detroit, Michigan: Wayne State University Press. .

Greek-American culture in Michigan
Greek-American cuisine
Greek restaurants
Hot dog restaurants
Michigan culture
Restaurants in Detroit
Restaurants by type